Harpanthus scutatus is a species of liverworts belonging to the family Geocalycaceae.

It is native to Eurasia and Northern America.

References

Jungermanniales